P. N. Das College, established in 1962, is a general degree college in Palta. It offers undergraduate courses in arts, commerce and sciences.  It is affiliated to West Bengal State University.

Departments

Science 
 Chemistry
 Physics
 Mathematics
 Computer Science

Arts and Commerce 
 Hindi
 Sanskrit
 English
 Education
 History
 Geography
 Political Science
 Philosophy
 Economics
 Physical Education
 Commerce
 Bengali

Accreditation 
P.N. Das College is recognized by the University Grants Commission (UGC). accredited by NAAC in 2016, Grade B

See also
Education in India
List of colleges in West Bengal
Education in West Bengal

References

External links 
 P.N. Das College

Universities and colleges in North 24 Parganas district
Colleges affiliated to West Bengal State University
Educational institutions established in 1962
1962 establishments in West Bengal